Dichomeris orientis is a moth in the family Gelechiidae. It was described by Kyu-Tek Park and Ronald W. Hodges in 1995. It is found in China (Hong Kong, Yunnan) and Taiwan.

The wingspan is 10–12 mm. The forewings are greyish yellow, suffused with dark-fuscous scales and a costal blotch at three-fourths the length of the anterior margin, as well as short dark-fuscous strigulae along the anterior margin before the costal blotch. There is also a broad, dark fuscous fascia along the termen. The hindwings are grey, darker towards the posterior margin.

References

Moths described in 1995
orientis